Golemale Pirit Koro Na (sometimes Goley Maley Pirit Korona, Goley Maley Pirit Koro Na or Golemale Pirit Korona) is a 2013 Bengali film. The film was directed by Anindya Banerjee and produced under the banner of Shree Venkatesh Films. The film's music was composed by Akash. The film was released on 8 February 2013. The comedy film is based on the story of two men who fell in love with each other's sisters.

Plot
Two men called Gouranga (Ritwick Chakraborty) and Gobindo (Jisshu Sengupta) meet in a nightclub and strike up a friendship and their cell phones get exchanged . When Gobinda comes to return the phone to Gouranga, he discovers that Gouranga has a cousin called Banya (Payel Sarkar) who is obsessed with Salman Khan and with the name called Prem and desires a boyfriend called Prem. So, he becomes Prem to impress her. Gouranga also lands up at Gobinda's house and discovers that he has got a sister called Rai (Sumita) who desires a boyfriend called Prem and so he too becomes Prem too impress her. Just when the confusion had started, there was  a complete chaos. Banya lands up at Gobindo's place and discovers he is not Prem. Her dominating mother (Sudipa Basu) lands up there with her helping hand, Kandarpo (Kanchan Mullick), who is the would-be-suitor for Banya. Just when he reveals facts like Gobindo being an adopted son, it turns out to be much more than that and finally it is seen that Gobindo and Gouranga are brothers and so Banya is their cousin and therefore Gobindo can't be with Banya anymore. Even after that something else was revealed - Banya's mother and Gobindo and Gouranga's mother (Manasi Sinha) were never sisters, but best of friends!

Cast
 Jisshu Sengupta as Gobindo
 Ritwick Chakraborty as Gouranga
 Payel Sarkar as Banya
 Kanchan Mullick as Kandarpo
 Sudipa Basu as Banya's mother
 Manasi Sinha as Smritiparna, mother of Gobindo and Gouranga
 Subhrajit Dutta as the cop
 Sumita as Rai
 Kharaj Mukherjee as Jagannath
 Bratya Basu as Nebu Kaka, Gobindo's uncle
 Rajatava Dutta (Special appearance)

Soundtrack

The soundtrack of Golemale Pirit Koro Na is composed by Akash. The film has 5 original songs which are sung by singles as well as in duets.

Track list

Critical reception

Golemale Pirit Koro Na received mixed reviews from critics. However, the soundtrack of the film gained positive compliments. As a whole, the film was an average.

The critics of The Times of India said -

See also
 Namte Namte, a 2013 Bengali-language films

References

Bengali-language Indian films
2010s Bengali-language films